Primarily in Austroasiatic languages (also known as Mon–Khmer), in a typical word a minor syllable is a reduced (minor) syllable followed by a full tonic or stressed syllable. This iambic pattern is sometimes called sesquisyllabic (lit. 'one and a half syllables'), a term coined by the American linguist James Matisoff in 1973 (Matisoff 1973:86).

Sometimes minor syllables are introduced by language contact. Many Chamic languages as well as Burmese have developed minor syllables from contact with Mon-Khmer family. In Burmese, minor syllables have the form , with no consonant clusters allowed in the syllable onset, no syllable coda, and no tone.

Recent reconstructions of Proto-Tai and Old Chinese also include sesquisyllabic roots with minor syllables, as transitional forms between fully disyllabic words and the monosyllabic words found in modern Tai languages and modern Chinese.

See also
Mainland Southeast Asia linguistic area
Stress in Khmer

Notes

References
Brunelle, Marc; Kirby, James; Michaud, Alexis; Watkins, Justin. (2017). Prosodic systems: Mainland Southeast Asia. HAL 01617182.
Butler, Becky Ann. (2014). Deconstructing the Southeast Asian sesquisyllable: A gestural account (Doctoral dissertation). Cornell University.
Ferlus, Michel. (2004). The origin of tones in Viet-Muong. In Papers from the Eleventh Annual Conference of the Southeast Asian Linguistics Society (pp. 297–313). HAL 00927222v2.
Ferlus, Michel. (2009). What were the four Divisions of Middle Chinese?. Diachronica, 26(2), 184-213. HAL 01581138v2.
 Matisoff, James A. (1973). 'Tonogenesis in Southeast Asia'. In Larry M. Hyman (ed.), Consonant Types and Tone (Southern California Occasional Papers in Linguistics No. 1), pp. 73–95. Los Angeles: Linguistics Program, University of Southern California.
Kirby, James & Brunelle, Marc. (2017). Southeast Asian tone in areal perspective. In R. Hickey (Ed.), The Cambridge Handbook of Areal Linguistics (pp. 703–731).
Michaud, Alexis. (2012). Monosyllabicization: patterns of evolution in Asian languages. In Monosyllables: From phonology to typology (pp. 115–130). HAL 00436432v3.
Svantesson, J.-O. & Karlsson, A. M. (2004). Minor syllable tones in Kammu. In International Symposium on Tonal Aspects of Languages (TAL 2004).
 Thomas, David (1992). 'On Sesquisyllabic Structure'. The Mon-Khmer Studies Journal, 21, pp. 206–210.

Phonetics